Jennifer Barton Boysko (born November 16, 1966) is an American politician from the Commonwealth of Virginia. She represents the 33rd district in the Virginia Senate. Previously, she represented the 86th district in the Virginia House of Delegates, which is located in Fairfax and Loudoun counties. She is a member of the Democratic Party.

Early life and career
Boysko was reared in Alabama and Arkansas. In 1989, she graduated from Hollins University in Roanoke, Virginia with a Bachelor of Arts in Psychology. Since 1996, Boysko has been a resident of downtown Herndon, Virginia, where she and her husband Glenn have raised two daughters, Hannah and Sophie Claire. She has been a grassroots organizer and leader in her community, volunteering her time for Herndon High School, the Herndon Fortnightly Club, the Herndon Optimists, St. Timothy’s Episcopal Church, Reston Interfaith, and other political and charitable causes.

Virginia House of Delegates
In 2013, Boysko was narrowly defeated for the House of Delegates 86th district seat, losing to the incumbent Republican Tom Rust 50.08 percent to 49.92 percent, a difference of 32 votes.

The 2015 election, held November 3, featured an open seat after Rust announced his retirement on February 25, 2015. For the primary election, held June 9, Boysko ran unopposed.  For the general election, Boysko received 54 percent of the vote; Republican Danny Vargas—who ran unopposed in his primary—received 42 percent; and Independent Paul Brubaker received 5 percent. According to the Virginia Public Access Project, Vargas outspent Boysko $654,725 to $476,322. Brubaker spent $9,100.

In 2017, Boysko was re-elected 69%-31%.

Virginia Senate
Following Jennifer Wexton's election to the U.S. House of Representatives in the 2018 elections, Boysko announced her candidacy for the special election to succeed her in the Virginia Senate. She won the Democratic Party's nomination on November 17, and won against former Republican Delegate Joe T. May in the election on January 8, 2019.

Boysko was elected to a full term during the 2019 general election, defeating Leesburg Vice Mayor Suzanne Fox 65%-35%.

Policy positions

Animal welfare 

In 2018, as a member of the House of Delegates, Boysko sponsored legislation that would require companies to avoid using animals while testing cosmetics or household cleaners.

Labor 

Boysko introduced a paid family leave proposal during the 2020 session of the Virginia State Senate. The bill would provide up to 12 weeks of paid time off for family or medical leave. The leave would be paid for by an insurance fund administered by the state and funded by a 0.5% payroll tax contribution by both workers and employers. Workers eligible for leave would receive 80% of their wages for up to 12 weeks.

Electoral history

References

External links
Official House of Delegates website
Official campaign website

Living people
People from Herndon, Virginia
21st-century American politicians
Women state legislators in Virginia
1966 births
21st-century American women politicians
Politicians from Pine Bluff, Arkansas
Hollins University alumni
Democratic Party members of the Virginia House of Delegates
Democratic Party Virginia state senators